Importin subunit alpha-4 also known as karyopherin subunit alpha-3 is a protein that in humans is encoded by the KPNA3 gene.

The transport of molecules between the nucleus and the cytoplasm in eukaryotic cells is mediated by the nuclear pore complex (NPC) which consists of 60–100 proteins and is probably 120 million daltons in molecular size. Small molecules (up to 70 kD) can pass through the nuclear pore by nonselective diffusion; larger molecules are transported by an active process. Most nuclear proteins contain short basic amino acid sequences known as nuclear localization signals (NLSs). KPNA3, encodes a protein similar to certain nuclear transport proteins of Xenopus and human. The predicted amino acid sequence shows similarity to Xenopus importin, yeast SRP1, and human RCH1 (KPNA2), respectively. The similarities among these proteins suggests that karyopherin alpha-3 may be involved in the nuclear transport system.

Interactions
KPNA3 has been shown to interact with KPNB1.

References

Further reading

Armadillo-repeat-containing proteins